Surrounded is a Norwegian film from 1960 directed by Arne Skouen.

Plot
The film describes how the resistance fighter Per, modeled on Knut Haugland, operated an illegal telegraph station on the roof of the National Hospital in 1944 during the Second World War.

Cast

 Ivar Svendsen as Per
 Kari Øksnevad as Anne Aulie
 Rolf Kirkvaag as Tore Aulie
 Alf Malland as Frimann
 Henny Moan as Frimann's girlfriend
 Sverre Holm as Tyrihans
 Egil Hjorth-Jenssen as Eliassen, the concierge
 Eva Rødland as Ingeborg, an actress
 Kari Simonsen
 Tom Tellefsen as Guttorm
 Kjetil Bang-Hansen as a courier
 Aud Schønemann as a nurse
 Julie Øksnes
 Sverre Shetling
 Tor Erik Mathiesen
 Jon Berle
 Jens Gjersløv
 Helena Krag
 Gry Enger
 Erik Melbye Brekke
 Edith Aadland
 Tørres Aadland
 Gordon Martin
 Eileen Smmott
 August Fromm
 Detman Loidelt
 Franz Faber
 Tor Erik Mathisen

References

External links 
 
 Omringet at the National Library of Norway
 Omringet at Filmfront
 Omringet at the Swedish Film Database

1960 films
Norwegian drama films
1960 drama films
Films directed by Arne Skouen
Norwegian World War II films
1960s Norwegian-language films
Norwegian black-and-white films